Temptation is a 1923 American silent drama film directed by Edward LeSaint and starring Bryant Washburn, Eva Novak, and June Elvidge.

Cast
 Bryant Washburn as Jack Baldwin 
 Eva Novak as Marjorie Baldwin 
 June Elvidge as Mrs. Martin 
 Phillips Smalley as Frederick Arnold 
 Vernon Steele as John Hope

References

Bibliography
 Dick, Bernard F. The Merchant Prince of Poverty Row: Harry Cohn of Columbia Pictures. University Press of Kentucky, 2015.

External links

1923 films
1923 drama films
1920s English-language films
American silent feature films
Silent American drama films
American black-and-white films
Films directed by Edward LeSaint
Columbia Pictures films
1920s American films